Gmina Potok Górny is a rural gmina (administrative district) in Biłgoraj County, Lublin Voivodeship, in eastern Poland.

Potok Górny is the poorest gmina in Poland.

Villages
Gmina Potok Górny contains the villages and settlements of Dąbrówka, Jasiennik Stary, Jedlinki, Kolonia Malennik, Lipiny Dolne, Lipiny Dolne-Kolonia, Lipiny Górne-Borowina, Lipiny Górne-Lewki, Naklik, Potok Górny, Szyszków and Zagródki.

Neighbouring gminas
Gmina Potok Górny is bordered by the gminas of Biszcza, Harasiuki, Krzeszów and Kuryłówka.

References

External links
Polish official population figures 2006

Potok Gorny
Biłgoraj County